Fritz Schneider (born 2 September 1928) was a Swiss ski jumper who competed during the 1950s. He finished 26th in the individual large hill event at the 1952 Winter Olympics in Oslo. Schneider's best career finish was tenth place in an individual normal hill event in Austria in 1953.

External links

Olympic ski jumping results: 1948-60

 

Olympic ski jumpers of Switzerland
Ski jumpers at the 1952 Winter Olympics
Swiss male ski jumpers
1928 births
Possibly living people